Andor (Original Score) is the score album composed by Nicholas Britell for the Disney+ science-fiction action-adventure television series Andor, the fourth live-action television series in the Star Wars franchise. The score (which was recorded over the course of two years) is notable for its prominent use of electronic instruments in much of the show's duration, in contrast to the orchestral scores in previous entries into the Star Wars franchise. The soundtrack was released in three volumes, including four episodes each to cover all twelve episodes of the first season. Volume 1 was released on October 21, with Volume 2 on November 4, and Volume 3 on December 9. The main title themes from the first three episodes were released as singles, coinciding its premiere on September 21. The score received critical acclaim with praise towards Britell's musical approach.

Background 
Series creator Tony Gilroy felt that "music in Star Wars is just absolutely essentially identified with John Williams", and saw the need to use a different musical vocabulary with respect to cast, setting and music. He contacted Nicholas Britell about composing music for the series before filming began so that he could use source music to be played on set. Andor is the first Star Wars project Britell has scored, who admits to being a huge fan of the franchise as well as a fan of Gilroy's works. They first met in August 2020, joined by the executive producer Kathleen Kennedy, who demanded the series have a unique sound. Britell agreed that the score would be "orchestral-plus" with a "wide range of sounds", adding that the large scope of the series meant that "every episode has new demands, new music, and new ideas." He also noted that "It's important that as the story evolves, the music should evolve too." Britell said that Gilroy gave him freedom to experiment with the music in order to create a unique musical landscape. Hence, he created a score that is marked by its heavy use  of electronic music and analog synthesizers, (deviating from the orchestral sounds of previous Star Wars films) though orchestral music was also implemented in parts. Recording for the series, which took place at the Lyndhurst Hall in Air Studios, London, began two years before Britell was announced in February 2022 as the composer. Multiple sessions were held at the venue and more than 90 players performed in the orchestra. Britell was not present at the venue due to COVID-19 pandemic restrictions, and his team supervised the recording sessions in his place while also managing other television series.

Composition 
The title theme consists of multiple versions which are recorded for each episodes, which either include synth or cello or a band performing the track. Each theme has different orchestrations as none of the opening sequences are the same for each episode. In the first three episodes, the music is there to provide a sense of atmosphere. For Kenari's theme, Britell had to "create that sense of a lost world and of childhood", hence he used wooden blocks and percussions, consisting of literally branches and leaves, and much of sonic creation and string motif mixed with synthesiser, adding "When you first see that ship smoking and about to crash, there’s this shaking sound of percussion, almost like an alarm. You hear that throughout Kenari, this sense of building tension. Each episode has its own kind of tension concept." Ferrix's theme had a "metal clanging sound of percussion" and Time Grappler sound that has been used with help of pipes in his neighbourhood, which had been modified to create the sound. Britell said, "For the Time Grappler with the anvil, we have a whole musical lexicon where the different tones he plays correspond to different signals to the Ferrix community. This is a culture where music has a meaning. People aren’t just looking at their watches; they’re waiting for the Time Grappler to tell them, 'Where are we right now? What do we do?' And the percussion alarm sequence in episode three — that’s a musical suite I wrote every element of. That is a specific rhythm, a signaling language, that we had everyone learn on set."

For Luthen's theme, he had used an orchestra, to give the "rich swelling sound to those strings that Tony [Gilroy] was drawn to" and a felt-piano score, played between Luthen and Kleya (also heard in the sequences between Cinta and Vel), which was "miked so closely that you really hear the mechanism of the piano and the felt on the hammers hitting the string". Britell felt that those sounds have a "kind of imperfection to them" and feel the physicality of that sound. He also wrote few on-camera music, which was the "Morlana Drop" played when Cassian enters the Morlana One, and consisted mostly diegetic music lasting for nine seconds. It was a cool-jazz, loud version of that track, and the theme which played at Niamos is called "Niamos piece". But Britell called it as "Galaxy Mix" as he felt it as the intergalactic version of the theme played in Morlana. When Cassian was given a sentence of six years on the prison planet Narkina 5, the theme for the location had a new soundscape with synths that are "strange, dark, and almost subterranean". The detuned synthesisers are used in the score for the eighth and ninth episodes, and in the tenth episode, at the prison escape sequence had an orchestral music, which consists of french horns and celli. In the pen-ultimate episode, a cello nonet of Maarva's theme was played with minimalistic music as to describe the silence in the score, feeling Cassian to be "let alone in the world".

The season finale, featured the main title theme played by the Ferrix funeral band performing at Maarva's (Fiona Shaw) funeral which felt like the "local townspeople" playing it. It was the first piece of music written for the series, even before filming, so that it could be used as the source music. Gilroy added "We need some clanging banging that makes sense. We need to make this music for Ferrix that's the street music. Then we have to have this funeral music, and it's about eight minutes of diegetic music, and we need to build it. I want it really played. I want it to be amateur, and I want it to be aspirational. I want it to be a civic experience." The Ferrix instruments had to be designed in such a way, that it had so many layers present in it. At the end of the funeral theme, a cyclic flute melody is played in the end, which was Maarva's motif. It was played in the end of episode three as suite theme, which Brittle described it as "there’s a kind of cumulative building process; you may hear things almost subconsciously early on, and perhaps it evolves. Hopefully, those things add up over time so you’ve created a sense of sonic memories. It has a potency."

Release 
The main title themes from the first three episodes were released as singles on September 21, 2022, coinciding the show's premiere. The soundtrack was released in three volumes: the first volume, consisting the score from the first four episodes were released on October 21. The second volume, containing the score from the other four episodes were released on November 4, while the third volume featuring music from the remaining four, were released on December 9.

Track listing

Chart performance

References 

2022 soundtrack albums
Walt Disney Records soundtracks
Andor
Music of Star Wars
Electronic soundtracks
Experimental music albums
Industrial soundtracks
Synth-pop soundtracks
Jazz soundtracks
Television soundtracks